Prohibido, titled Forbidden in some countries, is a 1983 music album by the Spanish group Barrabás. It was the band's ninth album, and the last for several years before a return to recording in the 1990s.

With the return of former members Iñaki Egaña, Miguel Morales and Tito Duarte, it was described by AllMusic's Andy Kellman as "a very slight improvement" over the previous two albums. He praised the musicianship as "top-notch and professional", but criticised the vocals and lyrics, singling out "Sex Surprise Big Surprise" as the worst example.

Track listing
"Saint Valentine" (Fernando Arbex) – 5:05
"Hollywood Ten O'Clock at Night" (Arbex, Miguel Morales) – 4:39
"I Need Your Lovin'" (Morales) – 3:40
"Inside of Me" (José María Moll, Morales) – 3:56
"Hello Hello (7th Ave/54th)" (Arbex, Morales) – 4:44
"Sex Surprise Big Surprise" (Arbex, Moll) – 5:45
"Lovers in the Rain" (Arbex, Morales) – 5:36
"Black Cotton Plantation" (Arbex, Jorge Eduardo Maning) – 5:00
""Heroine" Stop the Horse" (Arbex) – 5:20

Personnel
Miguel Morales – guitar, vocals
Iñaki Egaña – bass guitar, vocals
Tito Duarte – percussion, drums
José María Moll – drums, vocals, production
with
Juan Aboli, Andrea Bronston, Luis Cobos, Javier Losada, Pepe Robles
Fernando Arbex – production

Release information
Spain – Discos CBS S25878

References

Album sleeve notes

1983 albums
Barrabás albums